The Ministry of Economy and Finance (MEF; ,) accounts for the administration of financial and economic policy and affair in the Kingdom of Cambodia. In accordance to the official website, the ministry was commissioned by the Royal Government of Cambodia to perform missions of guidances and administrations in economic and financial affairs. The current Minister responsible for the Ministry of Economic and Finance is Aun Porn Moniroth, as of 2013. The main ministerial office is  located in Phnom Penh, while the provincial branches are located across the main capitals of each province.

The managerial structure is divided into five ranks: Minister, Secretary of State, Deputy Secretary of State, Secretary General, and Deputy Secretary General. They are responsible for the administration in the distribution and allocation of budget, creation of policy, implementing and enhance existing policies in the extension of designated departments as well as the extended departments in provincial branches. The level of authority in budget and policy approval and implementation are based on the primary and secondary ranks of the administrative figures.

Departments
The departments of the Ministry include:
Economic and Public Finance Policy Department
Administration and Finance Department
General Department of Taxation
General Department of Customs and Excise
Investment and Cooperation Department
National Treasury
Non-tax Revenue Department
Financial Industry Department
Budget Department
Financial Affairs Department
Local Finance Department
Internal Audit Department
State Property Department
Public Procurement Department
Personnel Department
Legal Affairs Department
Economic Integration and ASEAN Department
Information Technology Department
Resettlement Department
Economics and Finance Institute

Ministers of Finance 1945–1970

Ung Hy, 1945
Penn Nouth, 1945
Nhiek Tioulong, 1945-1946
Son Sann, 1946-1947
Au Chhuen, 1949-1950
Nhiek Tioulong, 1951
Yem Sambaur, 1954
Pho Proeung, 1955
Sam Sary, 1955-1956
Huot Sam Ath, 1956
San Yun, 1957
Truong Cang, 1957-1958
Son Sann, 1958-?
Touch Kim, 1958
Truong Cang, 1959
Son Sann, 1961-1962
Hou Youn, 1962
Chai Thoul, ?-1963-?
Hing Kunthel, ?-1966-1967
Touch Kim, 1967-1968
Yem Sarong, 1968-1969
Op Kim Ang, 1969-1970

Ministers of Finance of Khmer Republic 1970–1975
Tim Nguon, 1970
Sok Chhong, 1970-1972
Ith Thuy, 1972-1973
Khy Taing Lim, 1973
Keo Mongkry, 1973-1974
Khy Taing Lim, 1974-1975

Ministers of Economy of Democratic Kampuchea 1975–1979
Koy Thuon, 1975-1976
Vorn Vet, 1976-1979

Ministers of Finance of People's Republic of Kampuchea and State of Cambodia 1979–1993
Thiounn Thioum, 1979-1981
Chan Phin, 1981-1986
Chhay Than, 1986-1993

Ministers of Economy and Finance since 1993

See also
 Economy of Cambodia
 Government of Cambodia
 National Bank of Cambodia
 Cambodia and the World Bank

External links
Ministry of Finance and Economy
Ministry of Finance and Economy - Department of Financial Industry

References

Government ministries of Cambodia
Finance in Cambodia
Cambodia
Cambodia
Phnom Penh
Ministries established in 1993
1993 establishments in Cambodia